Gabriel Farfán Stopani (born June 23, 1988, in San Diego, California) is an American former soccer player who played for Clubs such as Club America, Philadelphia Union, Chivas USA, Chiapas F.C. and New York Cosmos.

Career

Youth and College
Played youth club soccer in Southern California where he captured numerous team titles, including the 2002 national championship. He also played in the Youth World Championships in Japan in 2000 on the Mexico national team. In 2004, he joined IMG Soccer Academy and remained there until enrolling at California State University, Fullerton in the Spring of 2006. After two years with the CSUF Titans in which he played with his twin brother Michael Farfan, he joined the youth system of Mexico's Club América. He remained at Club América for two years before returning to the United States.

During his college years Farfan also played extensively in the USL Premier Development League, for Orange County Blue Star, Ventura County Fusion and the Los Angeles Legends.

Professional
After trialling with the club during the 2011 MLS pre-season, Farfan signed with Philadelphia Union in March, 2011 He made his professional debut in Philadelphia's opening game of the 2011 MLS season, a 1–0 win over Houston Dynamo. Farfan scored his first professional goal on May 28, 2011, in a comprehensive 6–2 victory over Toronto FC. 

Farfan was traded to Chivas USA in 2013 in exchange for a 2014 MLS SuperDraft first-round pick. Farfan was loaned to Chiapas in early 2014 and later was sold to the Mexican club.

On July 1, 2016, Farfán signed with Miami FC.

On April 21, 2018, Farfán made posts on social media announcing his retirement from professional soccer.

International
Farfan was a member of the United States U-17 and played in the 2005 Youth World Cup.

Career statistics

Club

Updated April 28, 2015

Personal
Gabriel's twin brother, Michael Farfan, is another former professional soccer player who retired in February 2017. The two were teammates from 2011 to 2013 with the Philadelphia Union.

References

External links
 
 Cal State Fullerton bio
 

1988 births
Living people
American soccer players
Cal State Fullerton Titans men's soccer players
Orange County Blue Star players
Ventura County Fusion players
LA Laguna FC players
Philadelphia Union players
Chivas USA players
Chiapas F.C. footballers
New York Cosmos (2010) players
Miami FC players
Soccer players from San Diego
USL League Two players
Major League Soccer players
Liga MX players
North American Soccer League players
Twin sportspeople
United States men's youth international soccer players
American expatriate sportspeople in Mexico
American expatriate soccer players
Expatriate footballers in Mexico
Association football midfielders